Elmo & the Orchestra is a CD by the cast of Sesame Street, which won a Best Musical Album for Children Grammy in 2001.

Track listing
 Introduction
 Symphony No. 40 in G Minor, K550, 1st Movement - Wolfgang Amadeus Mozart 
 24 Caprices Opus No.1
 Sabre Dance
 Serenade No. 13 in G Major, Eine Kleine Nachtmusik, K525, 1st Movement - Wolfgang Amadeus Mozart
 Peer Gynt Suite No. 1, Morning Mood - Edvard Grieg
 Water Music Suite No. 2 in D Major, Alla Hornpipe - George Frideric Handel
 J'aime Percussion
 Waltz Opus 64 No. 1
 Piano Concerto No. 21 in C Major, K467, 2nd Movement - Wolfgang Amadeus Mozart
 Thunderstorm from "Symphony No. 6 in F Major, Pastoral" - Ludwig van Beethoven
 Flight of the Bumblebee - Nikolai Rimsky-Korsakov
 Carnival of the Animals, Swan -  Camille Saint-Saëns
 The Nutcracker Suite, Dance of the Sugar Plum Fairies - Pyotr Ilyich Tchaikovsky
 Can-Can - Jacques Offenbach
 Lullaby - Johannes Brahms
 Symphony No. 94 in G Major, Surprise, 2nd Movement - Franz Joseph Haydn
 Ride of the Valkyries - Richard Wagner
 Blue Danube Waltz - Johann Strauss, Jr.
 Symphony No. 5 in C Minor, 1st Movement - Ludwig van Beethoven

See also
Sesame Street discography

Sesame Street albums
2001 albums
Grammy Award for Best Musical Album for Children